Patrick Rémy may refer to:

Patrick Rémy (footballer) (born 1954), French former footballer and football manager
Patrick Rémy (skier) (born 1965), French cross-country skier